Anna Efimenko is a Paralympic swimmer from Russia competing mainly in category S12 events, for visually impaired competitors.

Anna competed in four events at the 2008 Summer Paralympics winning three silver and a bronze. She won a bronze in the S13 backstroke and a silver in the S13  freestyle where she broke the world record for a S12 category swimmer. She also finished second in both the S12  and  freestyle events behind team mate Oxana Savchenko who set new world records in both distances.

References

External links
 

Paralympic swimmers of Russia
Swimmers at the 2008 Summer Paralympics
Swimmers at the 2012 Summer Paralympics
Paralympic silver medalists for Russia
Paralympic bronze medalists for Russia
Russian female backstroke swimmers
Living people
Medalists at the 2008 Summer Paralympics
S12-classified Paralympic swimmers
Year of birth missing (living people)
Medalists at the World Para Swimming Championships
Medalists at the World Para Swimming European Championships
Paralympic medalists in swimming
Russian female freestyle swimmers